Nomothete may refer to: 
 Legislator
 Adam (Bible), the namer of animals in the Bible